Inglewood High School is a decile 7, co-educational state secondary school (Years 9–13) in Inglewood in the Taranaki region of New Zealand's North Island.

The school was officially opened on 6 June 1957 by  The Hon. R.M. Algie, Minister of Education, and it celebrated its 60th jubilee in 2017.

Approximately  students are enrolled at the school from year to year.

Crest 
The school crest was designed in 1957 by Margaret Stevenson (nee Cooke). It displays nearby Mt Taranaki, the book of learning, the messenger's feet and the motto, constantia vincit (constant effort ensures success).

Principals 
Charles Caldwell (1957–1959)
Garfield Johnson (1959–1965)
Alexander Black (1966–1968)
Jack Porter (1968–1972)
John Smith (1973–1982)
Bob Clague (1983–1990)
Lyn Bublitz (1991–2001)
Angela Gattung (2002–2008)
Rosey Mabin (2009–present)

Notable alumni

Erika Burgess – Netball player
Lauren Burgess – Netball player
Fleur Beale (née Corney; born 1945), fiction writer
Fiona Clark - Photographer
Bruce Gall – Rugby League footballer
David Gauld – Mathematician
Dave Loveridge – Rugby union player, All Black
Bill Vincent – Judoka, Olympian

References

1957 establishments in New Zealand
Educational institutions established in 1957
Secondary schools in Taranaki